Valentine Lawrence (5 May 1889 – 1961) was a Scottish footballer who played for Forfar Athletic, Manchester City, Oldham Athletic, Leeds City, Dundee Hibernian, Morton and Dumbarton.

References

1889 births
1961 deaths
Scottish footballers
Forfar Athletic F.C. players
Manchester City F.C. players
Oldham Athletic A.F.C. players
Leeds City F.C. players
Dundee United F.C. players
Greenock Morton F.C. players
Dumbarton F.C. players
Scottish Football League players
English Football League players
Date of death missing
People from Arbroath
Association football midfielders
Footballers from Angus, Scotland